Pallavi Pradhan is an Indian television and film actress. She has done several TV shows and is known for her roles in Bahu Hamari Rajni Kant and Jiji Maa.

Career 
Pradhan started working as a Gujarati theater artist in 1995 and appeared in plays such as Arechya Sutala Ki Rao, Baa Na Gher Babo Aavyo, Kaanch Na Sambandh, Haarkh Padudi Hansa, and Jantar Mantar. She worked in different languages including Gujarati, Marathi and Hindi.

On television, Pradhan was first seen in the show Ek Mahal Ho Sapno Ka as Rashmi Nanavati. She also had a small role in Sarabhai vs Sarabhai. She played a comic role on the SAB TV show Sajan Re Jhooth Mat Bolo.

Pradhan appeared in the recent show Bahu Hamari Rajni Kant as Surili Kant and was most recently seen in Jiji Maa on Star Bharat.

Filmography

Television

Film

Web series

Awards and nominations

References

Living people
Indian film actresses
Indian television actresses
Actresses from Pune
Actresses in Marathi television
Actresses in Hindi television
Actresses in Gujarati cinema
20th-century Indian actresses
21st-century Indian actresses
Year of birth missing (living people)